Kumanovo is a municipality located in the northern part of North Macedonia. Kumanovo is also the name of the city where the municipal seat is found. Kumanovo Municipality is part of the Northeastern Statistical Region.

Geography
The municipality has an area of 509,48 km² and borders Lipkovo Municipality, Ilinden Municipality and Aračinovo Municipality to the west, Serbia to the north, Sveti Nikole Municipality and Petrovec Municipality to the south, and Staro Nagoričane Municipality and Kratovo Municipality to the east.

History
Kumanovo as an inhabited area date from 1519. The most detailed data comes from Evliya Çelebi, who traveled to the region. The area was inhabited by 52 families and 300 residents. After the Karposh uprising in 1689, Kumanovo entered a period of growth stagnation. After 1945, Kumanovo experienced fast economic, administrative and cultural development.

By the 2003 territorial division of the republic, Orašac Municipality was merged with Kumanovo as was part of the rural Klečevce Municipality. The other part of Klečevce was attached to Staro Nagoričane Municipality.

Demographics
Kumanovo had 94,589 inhabitants in 1994 and 98,104 at the last national census. The present-day municipality has 98,104 inhabitants, which makes it the most populous municipality in Macedonia.

According to the 2021 census, ethnic groups in the Kumanovo Municipality include:

Inhabited places

There are 48 inhabited places in this municipality, one town and 49 villages.

See also
Mayor of Kumanovo Municipality.
Coat of arms of Kumanovo
List of mayors of Kumanovo
Maksim Dimitrievski

References

External links
 Official website

 
Northeastern Statistical Region
Municipalities of North Macedonia